Zoran Ubavič (28 October 1965 – 21 November 2015) was Slovenian footballer who played as a forward. Ubavič spent his entire career playing for Slovenian clubs, and was capped once for the Slovenian national team in 1992.

Ubavič was also Slovenian PrvaLiga top scorer in its inaugural 1991–92 season.

Honours
Olimpija
Slovenian Republic Cup: 1986–87
Slovenian Republic League: 1986–87
Slovenian PrvaLiga: 1991–92, 1992–93, 1993–94, 1994–95
Slovenian Cup: 1992–93

Koper
Slovenian Republic Cup: 1990–91

Gorica
Slovenian PrvaLiga: 1995–96
Slovenian Supercup: 1996

References

External links

1965 births
2015 deaths
Slovenian footballers
Association football forwards
NK Olimpija Ljubljana (1945–2005) players
ND Gorica players
NK Slavija Vevče players
NK Ljubljana players
NK Svoboda Ljubljana players
NK Ivančna Gorica players
NK IB 1975 Ljubljana players
NK Olimpija Ljubljana (2005) players
Yugoslav First League players
Yugoslav Second League players
Slovenian PrvaLiga players
Slovenian Second League players
Slovenia international footballers